Trampas may refer to:

People
Trampas Parker (b. 1967), American professional motocross racer
Trampas Whiteman (b. 1972), American writer and game designer
Trampas, a fictional character in The Virginian, an American western TV series

Places
Trampas, or Las Trampas, an unincorporated town in New Mexico, United States

See also
Trampas Canyon, a river in California, United States